Duhagadhi  is a village development committee in Jhapa District in the Province No. 1 of south-eastern Nepal. At the time of the 1991 Nepal census it had a population of 6499 people living in 1339 individual households.

References

Populated places in Jhapa District